Dad Is Back is a Chinese reality-variety show that airs on ZRTG's Zhejiang Television, starring former Taiwanese boy band Fahrenheit member Wu Chun, film producer and president of Huayi Brothers film production company Zhong Lei Wang, actor Jia Nailiang, and former national gymnast Li Xiapeng. The show began airing on April 24, 2014, Thursday nights at 10:00 PM Beijing Time with 12 episodes total.

Synopsis
Celebrity dads are left to care for their kids alone for 48 hours without the help of anyone, while their wives leaves the home.

Development
The show is adapted from South Korean reality show The Return of Superman, about celebrity dads taking care of their real-life children, without their wives, on their own for 48 hours. The production team from Dad Is Back collaborated with the Korean production team from The Return of Superman on the show. To avoid plagiarism rumors, the Chinese title was renamed instead of following the Korean title.

Format
The show is filmed with multiple cameras set up in the celebrities home. Unlike the Korean version, on early episodes cameraman's are clearly visible and not hidden in tents or playhouses. Starting from episode 5 tents and playhouses are used to hide the cameraman's presence in the dads home. Filming takes place at each of the celebrities actual home or work place. Family and friends of the celebrity dads will occasionally show up in each episode. Also unlike its Korean counterpart there is no narrator, a recorded track of a child's voice saying "Daddy" is played when one segment is shown to the next.

Cast

Current cast

Former cast

: Wang Zhong Lei has an older daughter who does not appear on the show. 
: Wu Chun has a younger son born in late 2013 named Max that does not appear on the show, but he is often mentioned in conversations between Wu Chun and his daughter Nei Nei on the show.
: Wu Chun's wife Lin Li Ying is the only mother/wife not to appear on the show but her voice can be heard on phone conversions between her, Wu Chun and Nei Nei.  
: Wu Chun and his family residence is in Brunei, but his work is based in Taipei, Taiwan.  
: Li Xiaopeng wife Angel, who was raised in the United States, can speak English and Chinese.

Episodes

Season 1 (2014)

Season 2 (2015)

Sponsors
HaoCaiTou is the main sponsor of the show. Their Xiao Yang yogurt drink product logo is intertwined on the top right of the shows logo. The product and logo is prominently displayed throughout each episode. Also the kids on the show are seen consuming the product.

HaoCaiTou Xiao Yang yogurt drink
Baojun 610 car
LUOLAI HOME TEXTILE CO., LTD.
ABC Kids 因为爱
OSM skincare 
weibo.com
LeTV.com

Controversies
Wu Chun and his daughter Nei Nei participation on the show was highly anticipated by audiences as viewers wanted to see how Nei Nei looked since Wu Chun had controversially admitted to being married and father of a child in October 2013 after years of denying he had a wife and daughter.
Viewers were appalled by Nei Nei's shower scene in episode 1. They questioned Wu Chun's parenting methods, complaining how he could strip his daughter naked in front of a camera crew since she was no longer considered a toddler.
Viewers were shocked by Jia Nailiang and his daughter Tian Xin taking a bath together. They complained about the scene that happened in episode 1 where Jia Nailiang, wearing skimpy shorts climbed into a bathtub together with his fully nude 1-year-old daughter to take a bubble bath together.

See also
The Return of Superman (TV series)

References

External links
Dad Is Back official website 
LETV page 
weibo page 
tv.sohu page 
tv.sohu page 
baidu forum page 
tudou page 
sogou page 

Chinese reality television series
2014 Chinese television series debuts
Chinese television series based on South Korean television series